Ty Bronna is a large detached house on St Fagan's Road in the Cardiff suburb of Fairwater. It was designed by C. F. A. Voysey for Hastings Watson, a timber merchant, and built between 1903 and 1906. The house has been listed Grade II since May 1975. It is the only listed building designed by Voysey in Wales.

The house sits on a hillside surrounded by trees above the St Fagans Road, the former stables to the south of the house were also designed by Voysey, built in 1904, and are Grade II listed. The RCAHMW report on Ty Bronna praises Voysey as having "...exploited the slope by placing the entrance at the short west end so that he could open up a five-arched veranda almost the full width of the south front which faced the view over the valley of the River Ely". The house is 3 storeys in height, capped by a hipped roof, battered buttresses rise from the ground to the eaves. It has a bowed east window with a recessed veranda and was restored in 2002.

References

External links
 

Arts and Crafts architecture in Wales
Grade II listed buildings in Cardiff
Houses completed in 1906
Grade II listed houses
Buildings by C.F.A. Voysey
1906 establishments in Wales